Amphiarthrosis is a type of continuous, slightly movable joint.

Types

In amphiarthroses, the contiguous bony surfaces can be:
 A symphysis: connected by broad flattened disks of fibrocartilage, of a more or less complex structure, which adhere to the ends of each bone, as in the articulations between the bodies of the vertebrae or the inferior articulation of the two hip bones (aka the pubic symphysis).
 An interosseous membrane - the sheet of connective tissue joining neighboring bones (e.g. tibia and fibula).

References

External links
 

Joints